Heine Brothers' is a coffee roaster and coffee shop chain founded in 1994 by Gary Heine and Mike Mays in Louisville, Kentucky. Mike Mays is a President now.

The company has 200-300 employees.

History 
The first Heine Brothers' shop was opened in the Highlands neighborhood in Louisville in 1994.

The company became "100% Fair-Trade & Organic" in 2002. 

In 2011, co-founder Mays bought out Heine's interests in the company and merged it with Vint, a local coffee shop chain. Today, the company operates 18 Heine Brothers' coffee shops within Kentucky and Southern Indiana.

In 1999, Heine Brothers' became a founding member of Cooperative Coffees, Inc., an importer of fairly traded and organically grown green coffee operating in the United States and Canada. 

In early 2015, in a partnership with Forecastle Foundation and Whole Foods Market, Heine Brothers' created "Kentucky Dream", a fair trade coffee blend benefiting conservation efforts.

In November 2016, the company relocated its roasting facilities and headquarters to Louisville's Portland neighborhood.

In August 2017, Heine Brothers' partnered with WDRB, a local, Fox-affiliated television station, to distribute eclipse glasses for the solar eclipse of August 21, 2017. Funds raised from the promotion, totaling $50,702, were donated to the Louisville Science Center.

In 2021, the company expanded with one more shop in Valley Station.

On May 10, 2022 several Heine Brothers workers announced their intention to form a union.

Production 

Currently, the company's products are made in Central America (Dominican Republic, Mexico, Guatemala, Nicaragua), South America (Colombia, Peru, Bolivia), Africa (Ethiopia), Indonesia (Sumatra, East Timor).

References

External links
 
Facebook page
LinkedIn page

Coffeehouses and cafés in the United States
American companies established in 1994
Restaurants established in 1994
Companies based in Louisville, Kentucky
1994 establishments in Kentucky